The Reutech Rogue remote weapon system is a remotely controlled turret system for weapons ranging from 7.62 mm general purpose machine guns up to 20 mm cannons or a 40mm automatic grenade launcher. A version for anti-tank guided missiles has also been developed. There are versions for land and maritime use manufactured in South Africa by Reutech Solutions.

Features
The control system of both Land and Sea Rogue mounts consists of a console in the ship or vehicle with a display screen for the cameras on the mount and a simple joystick control. The turret is gyro-stabilised and electrically driven. An optical observation and sighting system is mounted on the turret alongside the weapon with a variety of daylight and thermal imaging cameras and laser rangefinder. The standard option includes a 3 field-of-view daylight camera and a Sagem Matis SP cooled thermal night sight. An optional fit consists of a Sagem CM# MR uncooled infrared night sight, a 2 field-of-view day camera and a laser rangerfinder.

Versions
The system is available in various version:
The "original" Rogue is fitted with an M2 Browning 12.7mm heavy machine gun
Cradle Rogue can interchangeably use a 7.62mm general purpose machine gun, a 12.7mm machine gun or a 40mm automatic grenade launcher
Super Rogue has a 20x139 mm cannon, either the Denel Land Systems GI-2 or Nexter M693
Missile Rogue mounts four ZT3 Ingwe anti-tank guided missiles and a 12.7mm heavy machine gun.
They are available in Sea or Land configurations for use on ships and boats or armoured vehicles respectively.

In September 2017 a new version, the Rogue Lite, was introduced. Designed for light armoured vehicles, it can be fitted with a 12.7 or 7.62 mm machine gun or a 40 mm automatic grenade launcher. A variety of optical sighting systems are offered.

Users
South African Navy - Two Sea Rogue systems fitted with M2 Browning 12.7mm heavy machine guns are used on the Valour class frigates.
United Arab Emirates Coast Guard - Sea Rogue is used on 14/16m patrol boats.
Benin Navy - Three patrol boats equipped with Super Sea Rogue armed with Denel Land Systems GI-2 20mm cannon.
Malaysian Army - placed on their DefTech AV8 Gempita

References

External links
Official website 

Remote weapon stations
Post–Cold War weapons of South Africa
Vehicle weapons
Naval weapons